Thomas Peterffy (born September 30, 1944) is a Hungarian-born American billionaire businessman. He is the founder, chairman, and the largest shareholder of Interactive Brokers. Peterffy worked as an architectural draftsman after emigrating to the US, and later became a computer programmer. In 1977, he purchased a seat on the American Stock Exchange and played a role in developing the first electronic trading platform for securities. Forbes magazine's 2021 list of The World's Billionaires estimated his net worth at US$25 billion, ranking him as the 65th richest man in the world.

Early life and career
Peterffy was born in Budapest, Hungary on September 30, 1944, in a hospital basement during a Russian air raid. His father emigrated to the US after the failure of the Hungarian Revolution in 1956. Peterffy left his engineering studies in Hungary and emigrated to the United States to rendezvous with his father in New York in 1965. When his father, who was living with his second wife, did not have room to accommodate his son, he gave Thomas $100 and told him to "make something of himself".

When he moved to New York City, he did not speak English. Peterffy began his career in the US as an architectural draftsman working on highway projects for an engineering firm. It was at this firm that he volunteered to program a newly purchased computer. Of his background in programming, Peterffy said, "I think the way a CEO runs his company is a reflection of his background. Business is a collection of processes, and my job is to automate those processes so that they can be done with the greatest amount of efficiency".

Peterffy left his career designing financial modelling software and bought a seat on the American Stock Exchange to trade equity options. During his career in finance, he has consistently pushed to replace manual processes with more efficient automated ones. He wrote code in his head during the trading day and then applied his ideas to computerized trading models after hours. Peterffy created a major stir among traders by introducing handheld computers onto the trading floor in the early 1980s. His business related to his AMEX seat eventually developed into Interactive Brokers.

He stepped down as CEO in 2019.

Following Brexit, in 2021, Interactive Brokers moved its European headquarters in London and outsourced its operations to two new continental centers. Thereafter, their Western European clients were served by a subsidiary in Ireland, while their Central European operations were based in Budapest. According to Peterffy, he chose Budapest because he was convinced that the Hungarian language and the “unique Hungarian logic” would result in above-average profitability; he also wanted to pay off the debt he owed to his native Hungary. The Budapest-based subsidiary, Interactive Brokers Central Europe Zrt., was established in Hungary and became a member of the Budapest Stock Exchange (BSE) upon its incorporation.

Regulatory influence and political views
In 1999, Peterffy was influential in persuading the Securities and Exchange Commission (SEC) that US options markets could be linked electronically, which would ensure that investors receive the best possible options prices. He has also testified before the United States Senate Banking Subcommittee on Securities, Insurance, and Investment about adding banking regulations.

During the 2012 United States presidential campaign, Peterffy created political ads in support of the Republican Party. Peterffy bought millions of dollars of air time on networks such as CNN, CNBC, and Bloomberg. The ads consisted of a minute-long spot narrated by Peterffy that warned against creeping socialism in the United States. The ads were considered remarkable in part because Peterffy was not a candidate and did not buy the ads through a 527 group but instead paid for them directly.

In the spot Peterffy said, "America's wealth comes from the efforts of people striving for success. Take away their incentive with badmouthing success and you take away the wealth that helps us take care of the needy. Yes, in socialism the rich will be poorer, but the poor will also be poorer. People will lose interest in really working hard and creating jobs."

Peterffy's ad received mixed responses. Joshua Green, writing for Bloomberg Businessweek, said "The ad, while slightly ridiculous, is deeply sincere and also quite affecting." Green also asked Peterffy whether the comparison between the United States and Hungary made in the ad was a fair one: "[Peterffy] couldn't really think that the U.S. was turning into socialist Hungary, could he? The government isn't suppressing speech and throwing political opponents in jail. No, he conceded, it wasn't. But it sure feels like that's the path we're on." Politico reported that the ad was "being hailed as one of the best spots this election cycle", and said that it could have been influential in Ohio due to its large Hungarian American population.

Voter registration records in Connecticut show that Peterffy has been registered as an independent voter. Campaign contribution records show that he donated at least $60,000 to the Republican National Committee in 2011 and that over the past few years (as of 2016) has mostly donated to Republican candidates.

During the 2016 presidential election cycle, Peterffy gave heavily to Republicans and donated $5,400 to the campaign of Republican nominee Donald Trump. Discussing the 2016 election in 2021, he said "I am actually not a Trump fan at all. I hope he won’t run again." Peterffy also says the Republican Party is "completely adrift". However, he did donate $5,400 to the 2020 Trump reelection campaign  and cited his support for the president, because he is "very committed to antisocialism, anticollectivism". Peterffy lives three doors down from Mar-a-Lago and is a member. 

Peterffy did donate $7 million to the Senate Leadership Fund a super PAC closely-linked to Senate Minority Leader Mitch McConnell. In the 2022 election he donated $6.8 million to Republican-aligned super PACs.

Interactive Brokers

Interactive Brokers Group, Inc. (IB) is an online discount brokerage firm in the United States. The company traces its origin to 1977 when Peterffy bought a seat on the American Stock Exchange as an individual market maker, and formed T.P. & Co. the following year. IB consists of many subsidiaries operating on most major stock, futures, bonds, forex, and options exchanges worldwide. The company commenced a public offering on 4 May 2007 under the ticker symbol  on the Nasdaq exchange. On October 5, 2018, Interactive Brokers moved its listing to IEX, becoming the exchange's founding issuer. Barron's Magazine stated in 2009 that Interactive Brokers maintains a position as "the least expensive trading venue for investors", and continued to be ranked by Barron's as the lowest cost broker as well as the Best Online Broker in 2019.

OneChicago

OneChicago was an all-electronic exchange owned jointly by IB Exchange Group (IB), Chicago Board Options Exchange (CBOE), and CME Group. It was a privately held company that was regulated by both the Securities and Exchange Commission and the Commodity Futures Trading Commission. The OneChicago corporate headquarters was located in the Chicago Board of Trade Building in Chicago's financial district. OneChicago offered approximately 2,272 single-stock futures (SSF) products with names such as IBM, Apple and Google. All trading was cleared through Options Clearing Corporation (OCC). At the time, OneChicago operated the only U.S. based securities futures marketplace.

Net worth
Peterffy owns 75% of Interactive Brokers and his net worth is estimated at 25 billion dollars as of 2021. He was the 65th richest person in the world, and the richest Hungarian in the World in 2021.

Personal life
He is divorced, with three children. He is an avid equestrian. He lives in Palm Beach, Florida. In 2015 it was reported that he had listed his 80-acre Connecticut estate for $65 million, but it eventually sold for $21 million.

Award 

 Hungarian Order of Merit  (2017)

References

Living people
1944 births
American money managers
American financial analysts
Stock and commodity market managers
American philanthropists
American billionaires
Hungarian billionaires
Businesspeople from Greenwich, Connecticut
Hungarian emigrants to the United States
American computer programmers
American chief executives of financial services companies
American financial company founders
American technology company founders
20th-century American businesspeople
21st-century American businesspeople